The Dar es Salaam commuter rail, informally known as Treni ya Mwakyembe ("Train of Mwakyembe"), is an urban and suburban commuter rail network serving the Tanzanian commercial city of Dar es Salaam. It is one of the two initiatives taken by the government to ease travel within the congested city; the other being the Dar es Salaam bus rapid transit system. Services are provided by the Tanzania-Zambia Railway Authority (TAZARA) and Tanzania Railways Limited (TRL).

History

Background
Prior to its launch, the Dala dala was the only major means of intracity public transport.

Launch
The inaugural journey commenced on 29 October 2012. The public affectionately refer to it as Treni ya Mwakyembe in honour of Harrison Mwakyembe, the Transport Minister at the time.

The Citizen reported in January 2013 that 'Zambia was opposed' to the project utilising the TAZARA track and that it wasn't 'properly consulted'. Zambian officials insisted that the matter ought to have been brought before the board of directors for approval as both the governments are equal shareholders. Minister Mwakyembe refuted these allegations saying all procedures were adhered to. An anonymous TAZARA board member commented that they had failed to convene their quarterly meeting for the past six months.

The Chartered Institute of Logistics and Transport presented an award to Mwakyembe in December 2013 for introducing this service.

The TRL Line launched on 1 August 2016, plying the airport route 3 times in the morning from 6 am and 3 times in the evening from 15.55 hours.

Routes

TRC line 
Tanzania Railways operates a  track from Pugu Station to the city centre via Gongo la Mboto, FFU mombasa, Banana, Karakata(Airport), Vingunguti Mbuzi, SS Bakhresa, Kamata(Kariakoo City BRT station) then finally Central.

TAZARA line
TAZARA offers two routes on its  rail network. The first from its station in Dar es Salaam to Mwakanga which lies on the outskirts of the city. It stops at Kwa Fundi Umeme, Kwa Limboa, Lumo Kigilagila, Sigara, Kitunda road, Kipunguni B, Majohe and Magnus. The second service runs from its Dar es Salaam station to Kurasini via Kwa Fundi Umeme, Yombo, Chimwaga, Maputo, Mtoni Relini and Kwa Aziz Ali Relini.

Operations
The service is available during the morning and evening rush hours throughout the week (excluding Sundays and public holidays).

Ticket pricing
TRL and TAZARA had proposed a fare of Tsh 800 (US$0.50) and 700 respectively for a single journey. However, the Surface and Marine Transportation Regulatory Authority (Sumatra) capped the adult fares at Tsh 600 (US$0.27) and 500 whilst students are charged Tsh 100 (US$0.07).

Finance
In May 2013, TAZARA line reported an increase in revenue from Tsh 40 to 50 million.

As of November 2013, the TRL line has been operating at a loss. It costs Tsh 4 million per day to run this segment whereas revenue stands at Tsh 2 million. The high operating cost has been attributed to the engines and wagons which aren't cost efficient for short journeys.

Future expansion
RAHCO, the holding company of TRL, issued a tender in September 2013 inviting bids for feasibility studies and the design of new railway lines from its central station to four destinations: Luguruni (Morogoro Road), Chamazi (Kilwa Road), Pugu (via Julius Nyerere International Airport) and Kerenge.

Incidents
 On 26 January 2015, the TAZARA line went astray and on the wrong track line.

See also 
 Railway stations in Tanzania

References

External links 
 
 When I missed the train, by Lawi Joel, Daily News.

Transport in Dar es Salaam
Rail transport in Tanzania
Metre gauge railways in Tanzania
3 ft 6 in gauge railways in Tanzania